The Toll Gate is a 1920 American silent Western film directed by Lambert Hillyer, written by Lambert Hillyer and William S. Hart, and starring William S. Hart, Anna Q. Nilsson, Joseph Singleton, Jack Richardson, and Richard Headrick. It was released on April 15, 1920, by Paramount Pictures.

Plot
As described in a film magazine, bandit leader Black Deering (Hart) leads his band on what he declares to be their last raid only to be captured when Tom Jordan (Singleton), one of the members, betrays him to the authorities. Deering escapes and attempts to reach the Mexican border. However, hunger forces him to enter a western town. Here he meets Jordan, whose opposition results in a burning of the town and Deering's escape and pursuit by a posse. He takes shelter in the home of Mary Brown (Nilsson), a widow who lives in a lonely cabin with her little son (Headrick). She willingly poses as Deering's wife, but the Sheriff (Richardson) is not convinced and asks permission to house his men in the cabin for the night. This brings about the situation where Deering, on his honor, must reveal his identity. News comes of a threatened attack by Jordan on members of the posse, and Deering requests the opportunity to die fighting and is given it. During the fight Deering kills Jordan, who is Mary Brown's missing husband. The Sheriff grants Deering his freedom.

Cast 
 William S. Hart as Black Deering
 Anna Q. Nilsson as Mary Brown
 Joseph Singleton as Tom Jordan
 Jack Richardson as The Sheriff
 Richard Headrick as The Little Feller
 Bill Patton as Hank Simmons (uncredited)
 Leo Willis as Soldier (uncredited)

Preservation

Copies of The Toll Gate are in the Library of Congress, Museum of Modern Art film archive, and the George Eastman House Motion Picture Collection. The film has also been released on DVD.

References

External links 

 
 
 Film stills and glass slides at silenthollywood.com

1920 films
1920 Western (genre) films
Paramount Pictures films
Films directed by Lambert Hillyer
American black-and-white films
Silent American Western (genre) films
1920s English-language films
1920s American films